Gary Neiwand (born 4 September 1966) is an Australian retired track cyclist. He is a former world champion, who also won four Olympic medals during his career.

Biography

Early life and career
Neiwand was born in Melbourne, Victoria, on 4 September 1966, the son of Ronald Charles Neiwand.

Neiwand represented his country at cycling for more than a decade. He was Commonwealth Games sprint champion in 1986 and won his first Olympic medal at the 1988 Summer Olympics in Seoul, winning bronze in the sprint event.

He repeated his success at the Commonwealth Games in 1990, taking the gold in the sprint. Neiwand won his first World Championship medal in 1991 in Stuttgart, winning the bronze in the sprint. He then went on to become the World Champion in both the keirin and sprint in 1993. 1994 saw Neiwand complete a hat-trick, winning his successive third sprint gold medal at the Commonwealth Games.

After cycling
Neiwand spiralled into depression after missing his goal of a gold medal in the Keirin at the 2000 Summer Olympics. He began drinking heavily, his marriage fell apart and he gained weight, ballooning to 116 kg.

In 2006 Neiwand was sentenced to eighteen months in prison for breaching a court order preventing him from harassing a former girlfriend.

Neiwand began his sentence at Port Phillip before being moved to Beechworth. He was released on probation after serving nine months in jail. He has since rebuilt his relationship with his children, Malcolm and Courtney, and ex-wife, Cathy.

Neiwand joined the Sunrise Foundation in 2007, an organisation which, through the high schools,  aims to demystify and tackle depression in the community. It is run by former North Melbourne and Sydney footballer, Wayne Schwass.

On 5 December 2011 Niewand pleaded guilty to two charges of wilful and obscene exposure in Melbourne, after having been charged on two separate occasions in January and May 2011 for exposing himself to women while masturbating in his car. These offences occurred after Niewand had been released on a court order in December 2010 on unrelated charges, where he had been ordered to attend Forensicare and counselling about his behaviour. The court heard that having attended counselling over the previous six months Niewand had made significant progress, had his drinking problems under control, and was concerned and upset about his offending and his predicament. The magistrate regarded a report from the Forensicare counsellor as "promising", adjourning the case until March 2012   when he was sentenced to four months jail, wholly suspended for two years.

Awards and honours
Neiwand received the Australian Sports Medal on 14 July 2000 and the Centenary Medal on 1 January 2001.

Major results

1986
1st Sprint, Commonwealth Games
3rd Sprint, Goodwill Games, Moscow

1988
3rd Sprint Summer Olympics

1990
1st Sprint, Commonwealth Games

1991
3rd Sprint, UCI Track Cycling World Championships

1992
2nd Sprint, Summer Olympics
1st Sprint, Copenhagen

1993
2nd Sprint, GP de Paris
1st  Keirin, UCI Track Cycling World Championships
1st  Sprint, UCI Track Cycling World Championships

1994
1st Sprint, Commonwealth Games

1996
2nd Sprint, Busto Garolfo
2nd Keirin, UCI Track Cycling World Championships
1st  Team Sprint, UCI Track Cycling World Championships (with Darryn William Hill & Shane Kelly)

1999
2nd Team Sprint, Frisco

2000
3rd Sprint, Summer Olympics
2nd Keirin, Summer Olympics

References

External links

1966 births
Living people
Australian Institute of Sport cyclists
Australian male cyclists
Cyclists at the 1988 Summer Olympics
Cyclists at the 1992 Summer Olympics
Cyclists at the 1996 Summer Olympics
Cyclists at the 2000 Summer Olympics
Olympic cyclists of Australia
Olympic bronze medalists for Australia
Olympic silver medalists for Australia
Cyclists at the 1986 Commonwealth Games
Cyclists at the 1990 Commonwealth Games
Cyclists at the 1994 Commonwealth Games
Cyclists from Melbourne
Olympic medalists in cycling
UCI Track Cycling World Champions (men)
Medalists at the 2000 Summer Olympics
Medalists at the 1992 Summer Olympics
Medalists at the 1988 Summer Olympics
Commonwealth Games gold medallists for Australia
Commonwealth Games medallists in cycling
Australian track cyclists
Competitors at the 1986 Goodwill Games
Medallists at the 1986 Commonwealth Games
Medallists at the 1990 Commonwealth Games
Medallists at the 1994 Commonwealth Games